Eleanor (Ellie) Jane Murray is a British-Canadian epidemiologist, science communicator, and assistant professor at the Boston University School of Public Health. Throughout the COVID-19 pandemic, Murray created a series of multi-lingual, accessible infographics to communicate information about COVID-19.

Early life and education 
Murray earned her bachelor's degree in biology at McGill University. She moved to the Columbia University Mailman School of Public Health, where she completed a Master of Public Health. After graduating, Murray moved to Massachusetts, where she joined Harvard University for graduate research; along the way earning a ScD in Epidemiology and MSc in Biostatistics. Murray eventually completed her doctorate in science at Harvard University. She studied the use of agent-based models in clinical decision making. Murray earned her doctoral degree in 2016 and was subsequently appointed a postdoctoral researcher. Her research considered causal inference as a means to improve evidence-based decision making in clinical medicine.

Research and career 
In 2019 Murray joined Boston University as an Assistant Professor. Decision making in clinical medicine and public health requires complicated choices between treatment pathways. To evaluate the most effective approach, physicians typically make use of observational data and randomized controlled trials, but in the absence of these, decisions can be made using a agent-based models or individual-level simulation model. Of these, agent-based models are more versatile; they can combine data from various sources to make more generalised inferences. Murray applies these models to a variety of medical conditions, including HIV, cancer and cardiovascular disease. Murray became well known for her use of social media, where she shares complex epidemiological concepts using Twitter threads and GIFs.

During the COVID-19 pandemic, Murray partnered with Benjamin Linas to create a series of resources for the general public. The resources included an infographic on what to do if you have a positive test, contact tracing, and how to talk about COVID-19 to children. She shared the resources through GitHub and they were translated into several different languages. She argued that the epidemiology community should use the attention they received during the COVID-19 pandemic to help people understand what epidemiologists do. She was regularly interviewed by the media, explaining concepts such as herd immunity, social distancing, and how to travel safely in a post-pandemic world.

As the pandemic progressed, people wanted information at faster rate than science was generating answers. Murray used social media to explain research findings and to debunk COVID-19-related pseudoscience. Amidst the confusion and misinformation, Murray collated a list of reputable COVID-19 experts who were active on Twitter. In particular, people looked to understand what was and wasn't safe to do as the world opened up from lockdown. Murray explained that everyone faced a spectrum of risk, and that people had to learn how to assess what level of risk they were happy to take.

As the virus spread around the world, fashion designers started to create novel face masks. Murray expressed her concern that designer face shields may not be effective in stopping the movement of SARS-CoV-2 through the air and may only act to change their direction.

Selected publications

References 

Living people
Year of birth missing (living people)
American women epidemiologists
American epidemiologists
COVID-19 researchers
McGill University Faculty of Science alumni
Columbia University Mailman School of Public Health alumni
Harvard School of Public Health alumni
Science communicators
Boston University School of Public Health faculty
21st-century American women